Leatinuu Faumuina Asi Pauli Wayne Fong (also known as Leatinuu Wayne So'oialo)  (born June 1959) is a Samoan politician and Cabinet Minister who has served as the minister of Commerce, Labour and Industry since 2021.

Faumuina worked as a cargo manager for Polynesian Airlines in the United States, before moving to Hawaii. After returning to Samoa he ran a shipping company. He was first elected to the Samoan Parliament in the Urban West seat at the 2016 Samoan general election.

In March 2017 Fong called for a law change to allow Samoans to gamble in casinos. In October he criticised "dirty politics" within the Human Rights Protection Party, alleging that factions were moving against Prime Minister Tuila'epa Sa'ilele Malielegaoi while he was in hospital in New Zealand.
In December he called for a relaxation of border controls with American Samoa. In 2018 he opposed the government's Customary Land Alienation Bill. In June 2019 Fong criticised the government's budget, claiming it was "unbalanced".

In May 2020 Fong was asked to leave the Human Rights Protection Party by Prime Minister Tuila'epa Sa'ilele Malielegaoi over his opposition to Tuila'epa's proposed constitutional reforms. In July 2020 he was sacked from the party. He remained in parliament as an independent.

In September 2020 Fong pledged his loyalty to former Deputy Prime Minister Fiamē Naomi Mataʻafa following her resignation, and promised to follow whichever party she joined in the 2021 election. On 17 October Fong registered to run as a candidate for the F.A.S.T. party in the 2021 election. As a result his seat was declared vacant under anti-party-hopping provisions. On 14 December 2020 the decision was declared unlawful and invalid by the Supreme Court of Samoa.

Fong ran in the seat of Faleata No. 2 at the April 2021 Samoan general election and was re-elected. On 24 May 2021 he was appointed Minister of Commerce, Industry and Labour in the elected cabinet of Fiamē Naomi Mataʻafa. The appointment was disputed by the caretaker government. On 23 July 2021 the Court of Appeal ruled that the swearing-in ceremony was constitutional and binding, and that FAST had been the government since 24 May.

On 19 December 2022 Leatinu'u was medevaced to New Zealand for treatment for a serious heart condition.

Notes

References

Living people
Members of the Legislative Assembly of Samoa
Human Rights Protection Party politicians
Faʻatuatua i le Atua Samoa ua Tasi politicians
Government ministers of Samoa
1959 births